Syntypistis fasciata is a moth of the family Notodontidae first described by Frederic Moore in 1879. It is found in Yunnan, China; Sikkim, India; Myanmar; and Java.

References

Moths described in 1879
Notodontidae